Arlington is a neighborhood in Northwest Baltimore, Maryland. Major streets running through the area include Wabash Avenue, Rogers Avenue, Dolfield Avenue, and West Belvedere Avenue. Two Baltimore Metro Subway stations, Rogers Avenue and West Coldspring are located in the area.

Demographics
Arlington, along nearby Pikesville, is home to a large Russian-American population.

As of the late 1990s, Arlington was home to a population of 6,000 Russian-speaking Jews from Russia, Ukraine, and elsewhere in Eastern Europe. By 2003, some 20,000 Jews of Russian origin lived in the Baltimore region, predominantly in Northwest Baltimore and nearby neighborhoods of Baltimore County.

Notable residents
Notable current and former residents of Arlington include:
 Sidney W. Bijou (1908–2009), developmental psychologist.

See also
 List of Baltimore neighborhoods

References

External links 
 Northwest District Maps
 Live Baltimore, Arlington Neighborhood

Neighborhoods in Baltimore
Northwest Baltimore
Russian-American culture in Baltimore
Russian-Jewish culture in Baltimore
Ukrainian-Jewish culture in Baltimore